Handika is an Indonesian surname. Notable people with the surname include:

 Caca Handika (born 1957), Indonesian dangdut singer
 Fajar Handika (born 1990), Indonesian footballer
 Rakasurya Handika (born 2000), Indonesian footballer

Indonesian-language surnames